Charles David Bailyn (born October 27, 1959) is the A. Bartlett Giamatti Professor of Astronomy and Physics at Yale University and inaugural dean of faculty at Yale-NUS College.

Education 
He earned a B.S. in astronomy and physics from Yale in 1981 and a Ph.D. in astronomy from Harvard in 1987. His Ph.D. thesis on X-ray emitting binary stars received the Robert J. Trumpler Award for best North American Ph.D. thesis in astronomy.

Career 
Bailyn's research interests include high-energy astronomy and galactic astronomy and he has published over 100 referred papers.

During spring 2007, Bailyn recorded ASTR 160, Frontiers and Controversies in Astrophysics, as part of the Open Yale Courses initiative.  Bailyn also recorded three updates to the course more than five years later on the subjects of extra-solar planets, black holes, and dark energy.

On July 6, 2016, Yale announced that Bailyn would become the first head of the new Benjamin Franklin College, which opened in 2017.

Recognition 
Bailyn was awarded the 2009 Bruno Rossi Prize for his research on the masses of black holes.

Family 
His father was historian Bernard Bailyn.

References

External links
Frontiers and Controversies in AstroPhysics, video course by Professor Bailyn at Open Yale Courses

1959 births
Living people
Jewish American scientists
Writers from Cambridge, Massachusetts
Yale College alumni
Yale University faculty
Harvard Graduate School of Arts and Sciences alumni
21st-century American Jews